The Sisters of Charity of Our Lady Mother of Mercy (SCMM) are a Roman Catholic congregation founded in the Netherlands in 1832 by Rev. Johannes Zwijsen, pastor of Tilburg, aided by Mary M. Leijsen, for the instruction of children and the betterment of people deprived of spiritual aid. The motherhouse is in Tilburg.

History
Because the founding of religious convents was not legal at that time, Father Zwijsen set up the firm of Verbunt & Co. as a front for the property and the work being carried out from there. In 1837 there was a request from the Jesuits at Delft for sisters to be sent to assist in their ministry. The firm of Verbunt & Co. was disbanded in 1848 when a change in the constitution rendered it unnecessary. That same year, the congregation received approval from Rome.

The See of Utrecht had been vacant for about three hundred years when, on the reestablishment of the Catholic hierarchy in the Netherlands in 1853, Bishop Johannes Zwijsen, of Gerra, was appointed archbishop of the reestablished Roman Catholic Archdiocese of Utrecht and Primate of the Netherlands. He found no Catholic institutions for the education of girls in this vast diocese, neither were there any teaching religious institutes, with the exception of his humble congregation.

Zwijsen's accession to the see gave fresh impetus to his cherished work, and from that time the congregation spread rapidly throughout the Netherlands and Belgium. Among these institutions were homes for the aged and infirm, the blind, the mute and also hospitals.

About the middle of the nineteenth century, when cholera was raging in the Netherlands, the heroic charity of the sisters even won the recognition of the fiercely anti-catholic King William III who conferred decorations of honour on the congregation.

In 1894 six sisters were dispatched to Surinam to care for lepers.

At its height, around 1940, there were approximately 4,300 sisters. The congregation operated training colleges for teachers in a number of locations.

Present day
The motherhouse of the congregation is in Tilburg.

The first school run by the Sisters of Charity was founded in the village of Pantasaph (North Wales). The former St Clare's Convent included a boarding school, a hospital and an orphanage. It was built by a Father Seraphin of Bruges, who brought the first group of sisters to it in 1861. It closed in 1977, having at its peak housed some 500 orphans. The site lay derelict for a number of years and was damaged by fire in 1985, but has since been partly demolished and the remainder restored as luxury accommodation. It is now a designated conservation area. As of 2019 the congregation has two houses in the UK and one in Ireland.

In 1874, a group of sisters arrived in Baltic, Connecticut and established the Academy and Boarding School of the Holy Family. Their ministry also included tending the sick in hospitals. A second school was opened in Willimantic, Connecticut. The members of the international community are based in East Haven, Connecticut.

In December 2005, this congregation had 889 members and 115 houses.

Sisters of Charity of Our Lady, Mother of the Church
In 1970, a group of sisters branched off from the Sisters of Charity of Our Lady Mother of Mercy to establish in Baltic the diocesan congregation of the Sisters of Charity of Our Lady, Mother of the Church (SCMC). It became a congregation of pontifical right in 1993. Their apostolates are primarily in education and health care. The sisters continue to operate the Academy of the Holy Family, a girls' school in Baltic.

See also
 Sisters of Charity of Our Lady of Mercy (South Carolina)
 Brothers of Our Lady Mother of Mercy

References

External links 
 Sisters of Charity of Our Lady Mother of Mercy Official site
 Congregation Of The Sisters Of Charity Of Our Lady, Mother Of Mercy, Tilburg in ODIS - Online Database for Intermediary Structures

Catholic female orders and societies
1832 establishments in the Netherlands
Religious organizations established in 1832
Catholic religious institutes established in the 19th century